Live in Adelaide '19 is the second in a trio of benefit live albums by Australian psychedelic rock band, King Gizzard & the Lizard Wizard, which was released digitally to Bandcamp on 10 January 2020. It was released simultaneously with one other live album, Live in Paris '19. The third album Live in Brussels '19 was then released five days later. The album debuted at number six on the ARIA Albums Chart.

Background 
The album features a set by the band performed at the Thebarton Theatre in Adelaide on 12 July 2019. Most of the tracks come from the band's later releases at the time; Infest the Rats' Nest (which as of this performance had yet to be released), Fishing for Fishies, Flying Microtonal Banana, and Polygondwanaland. Two other tracks come from earlier releases, namely "Hot Water" from I'm in Your Mind Fuzz, and the album closer, a nearly half-hour long rendition of "Head On/Pill" from Float Along – Fill Your Lungs which integrated elements of tracks from other releases such as "Hot Water", "Altered Beast", "Cellophane", "I'm in Your Mind", "Am I in Heaven?" and "Rattlesnake".

All of the proceeds have gone to Animals Australia in response to the 2019–2020 Australian bushfires.

Track listing

Personnel
King Gizzard & the Lizard Wizard
 Michael Cavanagh – drums 
 Cook Craig – guitar, keyboard  
 Ambrose Kenny-Smith – harmonica, vocals, keyboard, percussion 
 Stu Mackenzie – vocals, guitar, keyboards 
 Eric Moore – drums 
 Lucas Harwood – bass guitar 
 Joey Walker – guitar, vocals 

Additional musicians
 Adam Halliwell – flute 

Production
 Sam Joseph – sound crew 
 Stacey Wilson – sound crew 
 Stu Mackenzie – mixing 

Artwork
 Jason Galea – cover design

Charts

References

2020 live albums
King Gizzard & the Lizard Wizard live albums